Awesome Feather (foaled March 15, 2008 in Kentucky) is an American Champion Thoroughbred racehorse who won the Breeders' Cup Juvenile Fillies.

She was bred and raced by Fred and Jane Brei's Jacks Or Better Farm Inc. and trained by Stanley Gold. Her jockey was Jeffrey Sanchez for all her races. She was sold for $2.3 million to Frank Stronach at the November 7, 2010 Fasig-Tipton sale after which her training was taken over by Chad Brown. 
Awesome Feather was sired by Awesome Of Course, her dam is Precious Feather.

2010 season

On May 1, 2010, Awesome Feather won a  4 1/2 furlong Maiden race.

On July 10, 2010, Awesome Feather got her first stakes race win in the J J's Dream Stakes at Calder Race Course.

Awesome Feather went on to win the Desert Vixen Stakes.

On August 28, 2010, Awesome Feather was undefeated when she won the Susan's Girl Stakes going 6 furlongs at Calder Race Course.

On October 16, 2010, Awesome Feather won the My Dear Girl Stakes at Calder Race Course as a favourite.

On November 5, 2010, Awesome Feather won the Breeders' Cup Juvenile Fillies. She was now undefeated in 6 starts.

2011/12 season
Awesome Feather won the 2011 Gazelle Handicap and on January 29, 2012, she ran away from the field in the Sunshine Millions Distaff and won by 5 3/4 lengths. Following an eight-month layoff due to tendon problems, Awesome Feather returned to racing on September 20, 2012, in the Nasty Storm Stakes at New York's Belmont Park. In a dominating performance, she  won by 11¼ lengths in the very fast time of 1:33.47 for the mile.

Career statistics

Pedigree

External links
 Video of Awesome Feather's win in the 2012 Nasty Storm Stakes

References

2008 racehorse births
Racehorses bred in Kentucky
Racehorses trained in the United States
Breeders' Cup Juvenile Fillies winners
Eclipse Award winners
Thoroughbred family 5-g